The 1959–60 Allsvenskan was the 26th season of the top division of Swedish handball. 10 teams competed in the league. IK Heim won the league and claimed their fourth Swedish title. IF Guif and IFK Malmö were relegated.

League table

References 

Swedish handball competitions